Andriy Nykytyuk (born 16 August 1994) is a professional Ukrainian football midfielder who plays for FC Volyn Lutsk in the Ukrainian Premier League.

Career
Nykytyuk is a product of the BRW-WIK Volodymyr-Volynskyi Sportive School System. Then he signed a professional contract with FC Dynamo Kyiv and afterwards with FC Volyn Lutsk in the Ukrainian Premier League.

He made his debut in the Ukrainian Premier League for FC Volyn on 14 May 2016, playing in the match against FC Hoverla Uzhhorod.

References

External links
Profile at Official FFU Site (Ukr)

Living people
1994 births
Ukrainian footballers
Ukraine student international footballers
Association football midfielders
Ukrainian Premier League players
FC Volyn Lutsk players